Wilkinstown is a townland and village in north County Meath, Ireland. Nobber is to the north, Kells is to the west, Navan at the south and Slane at the east.

Amenities
Amenities in Wilkinstown include a pub, community centre, convenience store and service station. The local national (primary) school, Scoil Naomh Barra, had an enrollment of 226 pupils as of the 2022/2023 school year.

By late 2021, work had commenced on an amenity park and playground, behind the community centre. As of 2022, the track from the Navan–Wilkinstown section of a nearby railway line was also being lifted for a proposed greenway.

Transport

Wilkinstown railway station, now closed, was on the disused Kingscourt branch of the Dublin–Navan railway line, and was situated in the village centre. At one point it had a signal box, goods store and passing loop; however the signal box was demolished and the passing loop was lifted, but the goods store is still intact, albeit overgrown. The station closed in 1947, with the line closing fully in 2001. The station is now a private residence.

References 

Towns and villages in County Meath
Geography of County Meath